St. James Episcopal Church, named for James the Greater, is a parish in the Episcopal Diocese of Utah of the Episcopal Church located in Midvale, Utah.

External links
St. James Episcopal Church
Diocese of Utah
The Episcopal Church
The Anglican Communion

20th-century Episcopal church buildings
Episcopal churches in Utah